Meje is a small settlement in the Municipality of Cirkulane in the Haloze area of eastern Slovenia. It lies at the top end of the valley of Belica Creek south of Cirkulane, right on the border with Croatia. The area traditionally belonged to the Styria region. It is now included in the Drava Statistical Region.

References

External links
Meje on Geopedia

Populated places in the Municipality of Cirkulane